Steve Frederic Sapontzis (born February 9, 1945) is an American philosopher and professor emeritus of philosophy at California State University, East Bay who specializes in animal ethics, environmental ethics and meta-ethics.

Life and work
Sapontzis was born in New York City, the son of Zissis Peter and Lea Marie Vial Sapontzis. He obtained his BA from Rice University in 1967, his MPhil in 1970, and PhD from Yale University in 1971. He joined the philosophy faculty at California State University, East Bay in 1971, and became professor emeritus in 1999. 

Sapontzis was co-founder in 1985 of the journal Between the Species: A Journal of Ethics and served as its initial co-editor. He was a member of the board of the American Philosophical Quarterly (1991–1994), and sat on the animal welfare research committee at Lawrence Berkeley Laboratory (1986–1990). In 1983, Sapontzis founded, with his wife, the Hayward Friends of Animals Humane society. They now operate Second Chance, Helping the Pets of People in the Need, in California. Sapontzis was also one of the first members of the board of directors of the Society for the Study of Ethics and Animals.

Sapontzis authored Morals, Reason, and Animals, in 1987, Subjective Morals, in 2011, and edited Food for Thought: The Debate over Eating Meat; published in 2004.

Selected publications

Books 

Morals, Reason, and Animals. Temple University Press, 1987.
(ed.) Food for Thought: The Debate over Eating Meat. Prometheus Books, 2004.
Subjective Morals. University Press of America, 2011.

Papers

See also
 List of animal rights advocates

References

External links

 
 Interview with Claudette Vaughan 
 30 years since the publication of Morals, reason and animals – Animal Ethics

1945 births
Living people
20th-century American philosophers
21st-century American philosophers
American animal rights scholars
American ethicists
Animal ethicists
Anti-vivisectionists
California State University, East Bay faculty
Environmental ethicists
Metaphilosophers
Organization founders
People from New York City
Philosophers from New York (state)
Rice University alumni
Sentientists
Yale University alumni